Phidippus purpuratus, the marbled purple jumping spider, is a species of jumping spider in the family Salticidae. It is found in the United States and Canada.

References

Further reading

 
 
 
 

Salticidae
Spiders described in 1885